National Highway 552 (NH 552) is a National Highway in India. It is a spur road of National Highway 52. This highway traverses states of Rajasthan, Madhya Pradesh and Uttar Pradesh.

Route 
The official listed route length of this highway is 486 km (302 mi).

Rajasthan 
Tonk, Uniara, Sawai Madhopur.
Madhya Pradesh
Sheopur, Goras, Shampur, Sabalgarh, Morena, Ambah, Porsa, Ater, Bhind, Mihona, Bhander.
Uttar Pradesh
M.P. border - Small stretch of 4 km up to NH-27 near Chirgaon.

Junctions list 

  Terminal near Tonk.
  near Uniara.
  near Morena.
  near Bhind.
  Terminal near Chirgaon.

See also 

 List of National Highways in India
 List of National Highways in India by state

References

External links 

 NH 552 on OpenStreetMap

National highways in India
National Highways in Rajasthan
National Highways in Madhya Pradesh
National Highways in Uttar Pradesh